Johan Veenstra (born 6 January 1946) is an author, poet, columnist and former radio host from the Dutch province Friesland known for his work in his mother tongue Stellingwervian Low German, for which he was invested as a Knight of the Order of Orange-Nassau.

Personal life
Veenstra was born on 6 January 1946 in the maternity hospital of Wolvega, Weststellingwerf in the Saxon part of Friesland, as sole child of an unmarried mother. He grew up in Nijeholtpade in the same municipality, where he still lives. Veenstra only discovered the identity of his father, as well as the existence of his half-brother, after his mother's death—a subject that features in some of his poetry, such as the poem Breur, and in his autobiographical novel Een brogge van glas, in which he also writes about his homosexuality.

His work
Veenstra is one of the core members and best-known writers of the Stellingwarf linguistic movement. In 2001, he was invested as a Knight of the Order of Orange-Nassau for his work in and for the Stellingwarfs dialect. His debut novel Een vlinder van zulver (1981) was the first regional-language literature in the Netherlands to feature modern literary devices such as flashbacks and stream of consciousness.

Veenstra made his debut as regional-language writer in 1971 as columnist in the Leeuwarder Courant. He also wrote and read weekly columns ("Stellingwarver Stiekelstokkies") on Omrop Fryslân's radio. A selection of these were published as books with accompanying audio tape in 1991, 1993 and 1995. In 2001, a selection of 24 columns was released on CD.

Publications

Wilde Gaanzen, stories and poetry, 1974
Fluitekruud, stories, 1977
As de wilde roze bluuit, poetry, 1979
Een vlinder van zulver, novel, 1981
Naachs goelen de honnen, novel, 1984
Lamert en Lutske, stories, 1987
De toren van De Lichtmis, stories, 1988
Lamert, Lutske en Doerak, stories, 1990
Stellingwarver Stiekelstokkies, radio columns, 1991
De boot naor Valhöll, stories, 1992
Stellingwarver Stiekelstokkies 2, radio columns, 1993
Sletel parredies, poetry, 1994
Stellingwarver Stiekelstokkies 3, radio columns, 1995
Een meenske is gien eerpel, stories, 1997
Verrassend Stellingwarfs, stories, 1998
Toegift, novel, 1999
Winterlaand, poetry, 2001
Wonder boven wonder, stories, 2002
De wereld is gek, stories, 2004
Een brogge van glas, novel, 2006
Longerlaand, poetry (with Peter Hiemstra), 2007
Et geheim van de wiend, novel, 2009
In brêge fan glês, novel, 2009 (Frisian translation of Een brogge van glas)
Mit et waeter veur de dokter, stories, 2012
Een vrouw van ivoor, novel, 2015
De overkaant van et waeter, poems, 2017
Vroeger is veurgoed veurbi'j, novel, 2018
Et liek in de Lende, literary thriller, 2021

External links

Notes and references

1946 births
Living people
Dutch male writers
People from Weststellingwerf